The 1957 Oklahoma State Cowboys football team represented Oklahoma State University in the 1957 NCAA University Division football season. This was the 57th year of football at OSU and the third under Cliff Speegle. The Cowboys played their home games at Lewis Field in Stillwater, Oklahoma. Oklahoma A&M officially changed its name to Oklahoma State University prior to this season, and the program competed their first season as an independent after over three decades in the Missouri Valley Conference. The Cowboys finished the season with a 6–3–1 record.

Schedule

After the season

The 1958 NFL Draft took place on December 2, 1957, at The Warwick in Philadelphia. The following Oklahoma State player was selected during the draft.

References

Oklahoma State
Oklahoma State Cowboys football seasons
Oklahoma State Cowboys football